Macungie  is the second oldest borough in Lehigh County, Pennsylvania. As of the 2020 census, Macungie had a population of 3,257. It is a suburb of Allentown, and part of the Lehigh Valley metropolitan area, which had a population of 861,899 and was the 68th most populous metropolitan area in the U.S. as of the 2020 census.

History
Macungie was founded as Millerstown in 1776 by Peter Miller.  On November 15, 1857, the village of Millerstown was incorporated as a borough.

During Fries's Rebellion in 1800, the United States Marshals Service began arresting people for tax resistance, and arrests were made without much incident until the marshal reached Millerstown, where a crowd formed to protect a man from arrest. Failing to make that arrest, the marshal arrested a few others and returned to Bethlehem, Pennsylvania, with his prisoners. Two separate groups of rebels independently vowed to liberate the prisoners and marched on Bethlehem. The militia prevailed, and John Fries, leader of the rebellion, and others were arrested. In 1875, the borough was renamed Macungie to avoid confusion with another town by the same name: Millerstown in Perry County, Pennsylvania.

Macungie is derived from "Maguntsche", a place name used as early as 1730 to describe the region that is now Macungie and Emmaus, Pennsylvania.  "Maguntsche" is a Lenape word, meaning either "bear swamp" or "feeding place of the bears".  The borough's current seal depicts a bear coming to drink at water near some cattails. The Valentine Weaver House in Macungie was added to the National Register of Historic Places in 1984.

Geography
Macungie is located at  (40.513945, -75.552491). Macungie is almost completely surrounded by Lower Macungie Township, except for a very small area in the southeast that neighbors Upper Milford Township. Swabia Creek flows from the west through the borough, receives Mountain Creek, and flows out of the borough to the northeast before draining into the Little Lehigh Creek.

Macungie has a hot-summer humid continental climate (Dfa) and is in hardiness zone 6b.

Demographics

As of the census of 2000, there were 3,039 people, 1,366 households, and 835 families residing in the borough. The population density was 3,057.0 people per square mile (1,185.2/km2). There were 1,418 housing units at an average density of 1,426.4 per square mile (553.0/km2). The racial makeup of the borough was 94.87% White, 1.35% African American, 0.07% Native American, 2.11% Asian, 0.03% Pacific Islander, 0.82% from other races, and 0.76% from two or more races. Hispanic or Latino of any race were 1.35% of the population.

There were 1,366 households, out of which 26.1% had children under the age of 18 living with them, 48.8% were married couples living together, 9.7% had a female householder with no husband present, and 38.8% were non-families. 31.4% of all households were made up of individuals, and 9.9% had someone living alone who was 65 years of age or older. The average household size was 2.22 and the average family size was 2.81.

In the borough, the population was spread out, with 20.5% under the age of 18, 7.6% from 18 to 24, 33.4% from 25 to 44, 25.2% from 45 to 64, and 13.4% who were 65 years of age or older. The median age was 38 years. For every 100 females there were 90.8 males. For every 100 females age 18 and over, there were 89.9 males. The median income for a household in the borough was $51,721, and the median income for a family was $56,848. Males had a median income of $44,821 versus $34,722 for females. The per capita income for the borough was $26,965. About 1.7% of families and 3.5% of the population were below the poverty line, including 1.1% of those under age 18 and 6.0% of those age 65 or over.

Industry
Macungie is the headquarters for the Allen Organ Company, a global manufacturer and distributor of organs.  The primary manufacturing facility of Mack Trucks is located in neighboring Lower Macungie Township.

Public education
Macungie is served by the East Penn School District. Emmaus High School in Emmaus serves grades nine through twelve. Eyer Middle School and Lower Macungie Middle School, both located in Macungie, serve grades six through eight. Students in kindergarten through grade five attend either Macungie Elementary School, Shoemaker Elementary School, or Willow Lane Elementary School. Salem Christian School, a private Christian school serving preschool through high school, is located in Macungie.

Transportation

Pennsylvania Route 100 crosses Macungie southeast–northwest as Main Street. Other outlet streets include Church Street to the southwest, Chestnut Street to the southwest and east, Walnut Street and Lehigh Street east to Brookside Road, and Willow Lane to the north. LANTA provides bus service to Macungie with LANtaFlex Route 501, which provides flexible bus service through advance reservations and offers connections to fixed-route buses in Trexlertown, Emmaus, and at Lehigh Valley Hospital–Cedar Crest.

Recreation and local events
 Bear Creek Mountain Resort, a locally popular ski resort, is located just west of Macungie in Longswamp Township
 Das Awkscht Fescht, an antique car festival that is held annually the beginning of August in Macungie's Memorial Park
 Macungie Flower Park, located on Main Street in the center of the borough, contains over 10,000 flowers, highlighting the train station located directly next to the park
 The Macungie Farmer's Market, held every Thursday evening from May–October in Macungie's Memorial Park 
 Wheels of Time, a hot rod and custom car show, is held annually on the weekend before Labor Day weekend in Macungie's Memorial Park

Notable people

Keith Dorney, former professional football player, Detroit Lions
Michelle M. Marciniak, co-founder of SHEEX, Inc.; former women's basketball coach, University of South Carolina; and former professional basketball player, WNBA's Portland Fire and Seattle Storm
Heather Parry, film and television producer
Nicole Reinhart, former professional cyclist
Elsie Singmaster, 20th century author
Kevin White, former professional football player, Chicago Bears, New Orleans Saints, and San Francisco 49ers
Kyzir White, professional football player, Arizona Cardinals

References

External links

Official website

1857 establishments in Pennsylvania
Boroughs in Lehigh County, Pennsylvania
Boroughs in Pennsylvania
Populated places established in 1857